Athletes from East Germany (German Democratic Republic) competed at the Olympic Games for the last time as an independent nation at the 1988 Summer Olympics in Seoul, South Korea.  Following German reunification in 1990, a single German team would compete in the 1992 Summer Olympics. 259 competitors, 157 men and 102 women, took part in 157 events in 16 sports. The team was officially announced on 3 September 1988.

Medalists

Competitors
The following is the list of number of competitors in the Games.

Athletics

Men's competition
Men's 5,000 metres
 Hansjörg Kunze
 Heat — 13:44.34 
 Semifinal — 13:23.04 
 Final — 13:15.73 (→  Bronze medal)

Men's 10,000 metres
 Hansjörg Kunze
 Heat — 28:22.09
 Final — 27:39.35 (→ 6th place)

Men's marathon
 Jörg Peter
 Final — did not start (→ no ranking)

Men's 4 × 400 m relay
 Jens Carlowitz, Michael Schimmer, Mathias Schersing and Thomas Schönlebe
 Heat — 3:08.13 
 Jens Carlowitz, Frank Möller, Mathias Schersing and Thomas Schönlebe
 Semifinal — 3:00.60 
 Jens Carlowitz, Mathias Schersing, Frank Möller and Thomas Schönlebe
 Final — 3:01.13 (→ 4th place)

Men's 3.000 m steeplechase
 Hagen Melzer
 Heat — 8:36.45 
 Semifinal — 8:16.27
 Final — 8:19.82 (→ 10th place)

Men's javelin throw 
 Gerald Weiss 
 Qualification — 79.16m
 Final — 81.30 m (→ 6th place)
 Silvio Warsönke
 Qualification — 78.22m (→ did not advance)
 Detlef Michel
 Qualification — 77.70 m (→ did not advance)

Men's discus throw
 Jürgen Schult
 Qualifying heat – 64.70 m
 Final – 68.82m (→  Gold medal)

Men's shot put
 Ulf Timmermann
 Qualifying heat – 21.27m
 Final – 22.47m (→  Gold medal)
 Udo Beyer
 Qualifying heat – 20.97m
 Final – 21.40 m (→ 4th place)

Men's hammer throw
 Ralf Haber
 Qualifying heat — 78.16m
 Final — 80.44m (→ 4th place)
 Günther Rodehau
 Qualifying heat — 78.12m
 Final — 72.36m (→ 12th place)

Men's decathlon 
 Christian Schenk — 8488 points (→  Gold medal)) 
 100 metres — 11.25s
 Long jump — 7.43m
 Shot put — 15.48m
 High jump — 2.27m
 400 metres — 48.90 s
 110 m hurdles — 15.13s
 Discus throw — 49.28m
 Pole vault — 4.70 m
 Javelin throw — 61.32m
 1.500 metres — 4:28.95s

 Torsten Voss — 8399 points (→  Silver medal)) 
 100 metres — 10.87s
 Long jump — 7.45m
 Shot put — 14.97m
 High jump — 1.97m
 400 metres — 47.71s
 110 m hurdles — 14.46s
 Discus throw — 44.36m
 Pole vault — 5.10 m
 Javelin throw — 61.76m
 1.500 metres — 4:33.02s

 Uwe Freimuth — 7860 points (→ 18th place) 
 100 metres — 11.57s
 Long jump — 7.00 m
 Shot put — 15.60 m
 High jump — 1.94m
 400 metres — 49.84s
 110 m hurdles — 15.04s
 Discus throw — 46.66m
 Pole vault — 4.90 m
 Javelin throw — 60.20 m
 1.500 metres — 4:46.04s

Men's 20 km walk
 Ronald Weigel
 Final — 1:20:00 (→  Silver medal)
 Axel Noack
 Final — 1:21:14 (→ 8th place)

Men's 50 km walk
 Ronald Weigel
 Final — 3'38:56 (→  Silver medal)
 Hartwig Gauder
 Final — 3'39:45 (→  Bronze medal)
 Dietmar Meisch
 Final — 3'46:31 (→ 9th place)

Women's competition
Women's 4 × 100 m relay 
 Silke Möller, Kerstin Behrendt, Ingrid Lange and Marlies Göhr 
 Heat — 42.92
 Semifinal — 42.23
 Final — 42.09 (→  Silver medal)

Women's 4 × 400 m relay 
 Grit Breuer, Dagmar Neubauer-Rübsam, Kirsten Emmelmann and Petra Müller 
 Heat — 3:27.37
 Dagmar Neubauer-Rübsam, Kirsten Emmelmann, Sabine Busch and Petra Müller 
 Final — 3:18.29 (→  Bronze medal)

Women's marathon 
 Katrin Dörre – 2"26:21 (→  Bronze medal)
 Birgit Stephan – did not finish (→ no ranking)

Women's discus throw
 Martina Hellmann
 Qualification – 67.12m
 Final – 72.30 m (→  Gold medal)
 Diana Gansky
 Qualification – 65.40 m
 Final – 71.88m (→  Silver medal)
 Gabriele Reinsch
 Qualification – 66.88m
 Final – 67.26m (→ 7th place)

Women's javelin throw
 Petra Felke
 Qualification – 67.06m
 Final – 74.68m (→  Gold medal)
 Beate Koch
 Qualification – 66.86m
 Final – 67.30 m (→  Bronze medal)
 Silke Renk
 Qualification – 63.64m
 Final – 66.38m (→ 5th place)

Women's shot put
 Kathrin Neimke
 Qualification – 20.18m
 Final – 21.07m (→  Silver medal)
 Ines Müller
 Qualification – 19.79m
 Final – 20.37m (→ 4th place)
 Heike Hartwig
 Qualification – 20.06m
 Final – 20.20 m (→ 6th place)

Women's heptathlon 
 Sabine John
 Final result — 6897 points (→  Silver medal)
 Anke Behmer
 Final result — 6858 points (→  Bronze medal)
 Ines Schulz
 Final result — 6411 points (→ 6th place)

Boxing

Men's bantamweight (54 kg)
 René Breitbarth
 First round — defeated Magare Tshekiso (BTS), 5–0 
 Second round — defeated Vedat Tutuk (TUR), 5–0 
 Third round — lost to Jorge Julio Rocha (COL), 1–4

Canoeing

Cycling

Seventeen cyclists, fourteen men and three women, represented East Germany in 1988.

Men's road race
 Olaf Ludwig — 4:32:22 (→ Gold medal)
 Uwe Raab
 Uwe Ampler

Men's team time trial
 Uwe Ampler
 Mario Kummer
 Maik Landsmann
 Jan Schur

Men's sprint
 Lutz Heßlich

Men's 1 km time trial
 Maic Malchow

Men's individual pursuit
 Bernd Dittert

Men's team pursuit
 Steffen Blochwitz
 Roland Hennig
 Carsten Wolf
 Dirk Meier
 Uwe Preißler

Men's points race
 Olaf Ludwig

Women's road race
 Angela Ranft — 2:00:52 (→ 25th place)
 Petra Rossner — DNF (→ no ranking)

Women's sprint
 Christa Rothenburger-Luding

Diving

Fencing

Seven fencers, all men, represented East Germany in 1988. Udo Wagner won a silver medal in the individual foil event.

Men's foil
 Udo Wagner
 Jens Howe
 Aris Enkelmann

Men's team foil
 Aris Enkelmann, Adrian Germanus, Jens Gusek, Jens Howe, Udo Wagner

Men's épée
 Torsten Kühnemund
 Uwe Proske

Gymnastics

Handball

Judo

Rowing

Sailing

Shooting

Swimming

Men's 100 m freestyle
 Steffen Zesner
 Heat – 50.73
 Final – scratched (→ did not advance, no ranking)
 Sven Lodziewski
 Heat – 50.77
 B-Final – 51.00 (→ 12th place)

Men's 200 m freestyle
 Steffen Zesner
 Heat – 1:49.13
 Final – 1:48.77 (→ 6th place)
 Thomas Flemming
 Heat – 1:49.52
 B-Final – 1:50.18 (→ 10th place)

Men's 400 m freestyle
 Uwe Dassler
 Heat – 3:49.90
 Final – 3:46.95 (→  Gold medal)
 Jörg Hoffmann
 Heat – 3:53.78
 B-Final – 3:52.13 (→ 9th place)

Men's 1500 m freestyle
 Uwe Dassler
 Heat – 15:08.91
 Final – 15:06.15 (→  Bronze medal)
 Jörg Hoffmann
 Heat – 15:14.13 (→ did not advance, 6th place)

Men's 100 m backstroke
 Frank Baltrusch
 Heat – 56.45
 Final – 56.10 (→ 6th place)
 Dirk Richter
 Heat – 56.52
 B-Final – 56.66 (→ 9th place)

Men's 200 m backstroke
 Frank Baltrusch
 Heat – 2:01.49
 Final – 1:59.60 (→  Silver medal)
 Dirk Richter
 Heat – 2:01.54
 Final – 2:01.67 (→ 5th place)

Men's 100 m breaststroke
 Christian Poswiat
 Heat – 1:02.99
 Final – 1:03.43 (→ 8th place)
 Raik Hannemann
 Heat – 1:04.46 (→ did not advance, 20th place)

Men's 200 m breaststroke
 Christian Poswiat
 Heat – 2:20.99 (→ did not advance, 27th place)

Men's 200 m individual medley
 Patrick Kühl
 Heat – 2:03.77
 Final – 2:01.61 (→  Silver medal)
 Raik Hannemann
 Heat – 2:04.03
 Final – 2:04.82 (→ 7th place)

Men's 400 m individual medley
 Patrick Kühl
 Heat – 4:18.60
 Final – 4:18.44 (→ 5th place)
 Raik Hannemann
 Heat – 2:04.03
 Final – 2:04.82 (→ 7th place)

Men's 4 × 100 m freestyle relay
 Dirk Richter, Thomas Flemming, Lars Hinneburg and Steffen Zesner
 Heat – 3:20.47
 Final – 3:19.82 (→  Bronze medal)

Men's 4 × 200 m freestyle relay
 Uwe Dassler, Lars Hinneburg, Sven Lodziewski and Thomas Flemming
 Heat – 7:16.61
 Uwe Dassler, Sven Lodziewski, Thomas Flemming and Steffen Zesner
 Final – 7:13.68 (→  Silver medal)

Women's 50 m freestyle
 Kristin Otto
 Heat – 25.85
 B-Final – 25.49 (→  Gold medal)
 Katrin Meissner
 Heat – 25.77
 Final – 25.71 (→  Bronze medal)

Women's 100 m freestyle
 Kristin Otto
 Heat – 55.80
 B-Final – 54.93 (→  Gold medal)
 Manuela Stellmach
 Heat – 56.14
 Final – 55.52 (→ 4th place)

Women's 200 m freestyle
 Heike Friedrich
 Heat – 1:59.02
 B-Final – 1:57.65 (→  Gold medal)
 Manuela Stellmach
 Heat – 2:00.30
 Final – 1:59.01 (→  Bronze medal)

Women's 400 m freestyle
 Heike Friedrich
 Heat – 4:11.30
 B-Final – 4:05.94 (→  Silver medal)
 Anke Möhring
 Heat – 4:10.64
 Final – 4:06.62 (→  Bronze medal)

Women's 800 m freestyle
 Astrid Strauss
 Heat – 8:28.07
 B-Final – 8:22.09 (→  Silver medal)
 Anke Möhring
 Heat – 8:30.95
 Final – 8:23.09 (→ 4th place)

Women's 100 m backstroke
 Kristin Otto
 Heat – 1:01.45
 Final – 1:00.89 (→  Gold medal)
 Cornelia Sirch
 Heat – 1:01.63
 Final – 1:01.57 (→  Bronze medal)

Women's 200 m backstroke
 Kathrin Zimmermann
 Heat – 2:12.81
 Final – 2:10.61 (→  Silver medal)
 Cornelia Sirch
 Heat – 2:10.46
 Final – 2:11.45 (→  Bronze medal)

Women's 100 m breaststroke
 Silke Hörner
 Heat – 1:08.35
 Final – 1:08.83 (→  Bronze medal)
 Annett Rex
 Heat – 1:10.61
 Final – 1:10.67 (→ 8th place)

Women's 200 m breaststroke
 Silke Hörner
 Heat – 2:27.63
 Final – 2:26.71 (→  Gold medal)
 Susanne Boernike
 Heat – 2:30.71
 B-Final – 2:28.55 (→ 9th place)

Women's 100 m butterfly
 Kristin Otto
 Heat – 1:00.40
 Final – 59.00 (→  Gold medal)
 Birte Weigang
 Heat – 59.97
 Final – 59.45 (→  Silver medal)

Women's 200 m butterfly
 Kathleen Nord
 Heat – 2:11.81
 Final – 2:09.51 (→  Gold medal)
 Birte Weigang
 Heat – 2:11.97
 Final – 2:09.91 (→  Silver medal)

Women's 200 m individual medley
 Daniela Hunger
 Heat – 2:16.23
 Final – 2:12.59 (→  Gold medal)

Women's 400 m individual medley
 Daniela Hunger
 Heat – 4:44.85
 Final – 4:39.76 (→  Bronze medal)
 Kathleen Nord
 Heat – 4:42.92
 Final – 4:41.64 (→ 5th place)

Women's 4 × 100 m freestyle relay
 Katrin Meissner, Sabina Schulze, Heike Friedrich and Daniela Hunger
 Heat – 3:43.13
 Kristin Otto, Katrin Meissner, Daniela Hunger and Manuela Stellmach
 Final – 3:40.63 (→  Gold medal)

Women's 4 × 100 m medley relay
 Cornelia Sirch, Silke Hörner, Birte Weigang and Manuela Stellmach
 Heat – 4:08.53
 Kristin Otto, Silke Hörner, Birte Weigang and Katrin Meissner
 Final – 4:03.74 (→  Gold medal)

Volleyball

Women's tournament
 Preliminary round (Group A)
 Lost to South Korea (1–3)
 Defeated Japan (3–2)
 Lost to Soviet Union (0–3)
 Classification matches
 5th/8th place: defeated United States (3–1)
 5th/6th place: defeated Brazil (3–0) → Fifth place
 Team roster
Steffi Schmidt
Susanne Lahme
Monika Beu
Ariane Radfan
Kathrin Langschwager
Maike Arlt
Brit Wiedemann
Ute Steppin
Grit Jensen
Dörte Stüdemann
Heike Jensen
Ute Langenau
Head coach: Siegfried Köhler

Weightlifting

Wrestling

References

Germany, East
1988
Summer Olympics
1988 in German sport